Julius Chaloff (September 2, 1892 – October 28, 1979) was an American pianist and composer. Born of Russian parentage in Boston, Massachusetts, he was the son of Cantor Israel Chaloff, of Congregation Ohabei Shalom, then located in Boston.  In 1919, he married a fellow musician, Margaret Stedman.  Chaloff was the father of jazz baritone saxophonist Serge Chaloff. Serge gained his earliest prominence as a member of Woody Herman's second herd also known as the Four Brothers. Chaloff was also father of Richard Stedman Chaloff Sr. who founded Stedman Ltd. of Brookline, one of the first custom audio / video installation businesses in the country. Chaloff was married to piano instructor Madame Margaret Chaloff, née Stedman, whose students included Keith Jarrett, Kenny Werner, Chick Corea, Herbie Hancock, Mulgrew Miller, Toshiko Akiyoshi, and Steve Kuhn.

As a child, Chaloff showed exceptional musical talent, and at the age of eleven entered the New England Conservatory of Music, studying piano with Alfred Devoto. He studied at this institution for six years and was the youngest student to receive a diploma, graduating with high honors at the age of 17. During the senior year he won the first Mason and Hamlin prize piano contest, the judges being George W. Chadwick, Charles Martin Loeffler, and Dr. Max Fiedler.

Chaloff spent many years in Europe, four of which were spent in Berlin where he worked with the Polish pianist Ignaz Friedman. He also composed and conducted with Hugo Kaun. His debut in Berlin with the Blüthner Orchestra, January 18, 1913, was a marked success.

In 1913, Charles F. Stoddard, a mechanical genius, invented and perfected the reproducing piano of the American Piano Company (Ampico). This instrument preserved for posterity the artistry of the golden era of great piano virtuosi. Almost all of the eminent concert pianists of the US, including such personalities as Rachmaninoff and Lhevinne, recorded for the Ampico. Julius Chaloff was among these artists. A few of the compositions that have been preserved onto a very rare and limited number of LP's which were recorded by Julius Chaloff are:

 Prelude, Fugue and Variation by Caesar Franck
 Barcarolle in F sharp major, Op. 60 by Chopin
 Ballade in F minor, Op. 52, No. 4 by Chopin
 Nocturne in D flat major by Debussy
 Viennese Dance, No. 1, in G flat major by Friedman-Gartner
 Memories, Op. 14, No. 1 by Chaloff
 Elle Danse by Friedman
 Islamey (Oriental Fantasie) by Balakirev

References 
Mason & Hamlin Co. "Julius Chaloff: Pianist" Mason & Hamlin Pianoforte
AMPICO Piano Roll #65343, Chopin Ballade No 4 in F minor, Played By Julius Chaloff on a Mason & Hamlin RCC
https://web.archive.org/web/20080604013843/http://glorat.home.mchsi.com/Ampico_Demonstrations/Podcast_2/Entries/2008/5/25_65343_Chopin_Ballade_No_4_in_F_minor.html

1892 births
1979 deaths
American male composers
Musicians from Boston
American people of Russian-Jewish descent
20th-century American composers
20th-century American pianists
American male pianists
20th-century American male musicians